John Peabody Harrington (April 29, 1884 – October 21, 1961) was an American linguist and ethnologist and a specialist in the indigenous peoples of California. Harrington is noted for the massive volume of his documentary output, most of which has remained unpublished: the shelf space in the National Anthropological Archives dedicated to his work spans nearly 700 feet.

Early life and education

Born in Waltham, Massachusetts, Harrington moved to California as a child. From 1902 to 1905, Harrington studied anthropology and classical languages at Stanford University. While attending specialized classes at the University of California, Berkeley, he met anthropologist Alfred L. Kroeber. Harrington became intensely interested in Native American languages and ethnography.

Linguistic legacy

Rather than completing his doctorate at the Universities of Leipzig and Berlin, Harrington became a high-school language teacher. For three years, he devoted his spare time to an intense examination of the few surviving Chumash people. His exhaustive work came to the attention of the Smithsonian Museum's Bureau of American Ethnology. Harrington became a permanent field ethnologist for the bureau in 1915. He was to hold this position for 40 years, collecting and compiling several massive caches of raw data on native peoples, including the Chumash, Mutsun, Rumsen, Chochenyo, Kiowa, Chimariko, Yokuts, Gabrielino, Salinan, Yuma, and Mojave, among many others. Harrington also extended his work into traditional culture, particularly mythology and geography. His field collections include information on placenames and thousands of photographs. The massive collections were disorganized in the extreme, and contained not only linguistic manuscripts and recordings, but also objects and realia of every stripe; a later cataloger described how opening each box of his legacy was "an adventure in itself." He published very little of his work; many of his notes appear to have been deliberately hidden from his colleagues. After his death, Smithsonian curators discovered over six tons of boxes stored in warehouses, garages and even chicken coops throughout the West.

Harrington is virtually the only recorder of some languages, such as Obispeño (Northern) Chumash, Kitanemuk, and Serrano. He gathered more than 1 million pages of phonetic notations on languages spoken by tribes from Alaska to South America. When the technology became available, he supplemented his written record with audio recordings - many recently digitized - first using wax cylinders, then aluminum discs.  He is credited with gathering some of the first recordings of native languages, rituals, and songs, and perfecting the phonetics of several different languages. Harrington's attention to detail, both linguistic and cultural, is well-illustrated in "Tobacco among the Karuk Indians of California," one of his relatively few formally published works.

In 1933, at age 87, Isabel Meadows was invited to Washington D.C., to assist Harrington with his research on the Rumsen life, language, and culture in the Carmel Valley, California and Big Sur regions. Isabel was last known speaker of their language. They worked together until the end of her life, on May 20, 1939 at age 94, in Washington D.C.

A more complete listing of the languages he documented includes:

 Abenaki language
 Achumawi language
 Applegate Athabaskan language
 Atsugewi language
 Cahuilla language
 Central Pomo language
 Central Sierra Miwok
 Chemehuevi language
 Chimariko language
 Chumash languages
 Coast Miwok language
 Coast Yuki language
 Mutsun language
 Cupeño language
 Diegueño language
 Esselen language
 Fernandeño language
 Gabrielino language
 Galice Athabaskan language
 Hupa language
 Juaneño language
 Karuk language
 Kato language
 Kiliwa Ute language
 Kitanemuk language
 Klamath language

 Konomihu language
 Lake Miwok language
 Luiseño language
 Mattole language
 Mojave language
 Northern Pomo language
 Northern Sierra Miwok language
 Paipai language
 Paiute language
 Rogue River Athabaskan language
 Salinan language
 Serrano language
 Shasta language
 Shoshoni language
 Southeastern Pomo language
 Southern Pomo language
 Takelma language
 Tübatulabal language
 Upper Umpqua language
 Wappo language
 Nisenan language
 Wintu language
 Yana language
 Yokuts language
 Yurok language

Personal life

Harrington was married to Carobeth Laird (née Tucker) from 1916–1923, a relationship that Laird later chronicled in her 1975 memoir Encounter with an Angry God. They had one daughter, Awona Harrington.

See also
Indigenous languages of California
Traditional narratives (Native California)
Native American history of California
Native Americans in California
Survey of California and Other Indian Languages

References

External links 

 J.P. Harrington Database Project
 Victor Golla, California Indian Languages (UC Press, 2011)
 Bibliography
 John Peabody Harrington: the clue to lost Native American languages: Mike Anton LA Times Staff Writer
 Keepers of Indigenous Ways: J.P. Harrington Biography
 "Reconstituting the Chumash: A Review Essay," Peter Nabokov, American Indian Quarterly, Vol. 13, No. 4, Special Issue: The California Indians. (Autumn, 1989), pp. 535-543.
 A Harrington Chronology
 John P. Harrington Papers 1907-1959 (some earlier)
 Los Angeles Times article and video about Harrington's research amongst the Chumash
 The John Peabody Harrington Collection at the National Anthropological Archives

American ethnologists
Archaeologists of California
 
1884 births
1961 deaths
People from Waltham, Massachusetts
Writers from Massachusetts
Stanford University alumni
Smithsonian Institution people
Linguists of Na-Dene languages
Linguists of Uto-Aztecan languages
Linguists of Yuman–Cochimí languages
Linguists of Chumashan languages
Linguists of Utian languages
Linguists of Chimariko
Linguists of indigenous languages of North America
20th-century American anthropologists